St Martin of Tours' Church, West Coker is a Grade II* listed parish church in the Church of England in West Coker, Somerset.

History

The church dates from the 13th century. It was rebuilt between 1863 and 1864 under the supervision of the architect, James Mountford Allen of Crewkerne. The contractor was Robert Bartlett and Son of West Coker. The north and south arcades were rebuilt with the addition of one bay westward on the north side. The chancel arch was rebuilt. The plaster between the rafters of the chancel was stencilled and emblazoned by Mr Stansell of Taunton. The chancel was fitted with oak stalls, and the floor tiled with encaustic tiles from Maw & Co. The reredos was made by A.W. Blacker of Dawlish. The church  reopened on 14 October 1864.

Organ

A new organ was installed in 1885. The gift of Miss Wood, sister-in-law of the Rector, it cost £500 (equivalent to £ in ) and was built by Nicholson and Lord of Walsall.

Bells

The tower contains a ring of 8 bells. Four dating from 1770, and one of 1779 were cast by Thomas II Bilbie of the Bilbie family. and the remaining three are by Llewellins and James and date from 1911.

Parish status

The church is in a joint parish with
St Mary's Church, East Chinnock
St Mary's Church, Hardington Mandeville
St Roch's Church, Pendomer
All Saints’ Church, Closworth
St Michael and All Angels' Church, East Coker
All Saints’ Church, Sutton Bingham

See also  
 List of ecclesiastical parishes in the Diocese of Bath and Wells

References

West Coker
West Coker
13th-century church buildings in England